Joseph Franz Baumeister (29 January 1857 in Konstanz – 3 May 1933 in Karlsruhe) was a German sculptor.

Bibliography 
 
 

19th-century German sculptors
19th-century German male artists
People from Konstanz
1857 births
1933 deaths
20th-century German sculptors
20th-century Swiss male artists
German male sculptors